Maria Magdalena Philipsson (born 19 January 1966), known by her stage name Lena Philipsson, is a Swedish singer, songwriter and media personality. She represented Sweden in the 2004 Eurovision Song Contest, finishing fifth.

Career 

Philipsson was born in Vetlanda, Sweden. She participated in the Swedish New Faces in 1982. Her career started with the single Boy/You Open My Eyes in 1984 and with her entries at Melodifestivalen in 1986, 1987 and 1988. In 1987, she released the song 'Aquarius 99', a duet with the Russian composer Igor Nikolaev. In 1989, she had great success with the album My Name, which included top hits "Standing In My Rain", "Why," and "Leave a Light". In 1991, she recorded a concept album and show about a female secret agent, 'Agent 006'. In the early 1990s, her fame increased in Sweden, and she continued to release albums until 1997. In 2001, she had a stage comeback; the Lena Philipsson Show was sold out for two and a half years around Sweden. In 2004, she returned after a seven-year hiatus from the album charts.

In 2004, she entered Melodifestivalen for the fourth time as a solo artist, with "Det gör ont". She made it through the semifinal process and emerged as the winner on 20 March 2004, going on to represent Sweden at the Eurovision Song Contest 2004 with the translated English language version "It Hurts". The song, composed by Thomas Eriksson, combined up-tempo and disco themes. Philipsson's stage appearance caused much controversy in the Swedish press and media because her performance, in a short fuchsia pink dress and high heels, consisted of dancing with the microphone stand in a fashion similar to Aerosmith's Steven Tyler.

Despite being the third favourite to win the competition, she finished in joint 5th place. The album, Det gör ont en stund på natten men inget på dan, went gold in nine days, with "Det gör ont" as its lead single. It also spawned the singles "Delirium", "Lena Anthem" and "På gatan där jag bor".

The Swedish radio show Tracks voted her best female artist, best Swedish artist, and artist of the year for 2004, and "Det gör ont" was voted best song.

She released her new album Jag ångrar ingenting in 2005. After one day in the Swedish shops, it had sold over 30,000 copies. A one-hour TV special featuring new songs as well as old hits and some interviews aired in November the same year. In January 2006, Philipsson announced she was to host the 2006 Melodifestivalen. Because Melodifestivalen is a family show, her appearance as host was met with some controversy due to numerous jokes considered inappropriate for the audience.

In early 2007, she released her new version of her greatest hits, "Lena 20 år". The album included hits from all her albums except "Fantasy." Also included was a new song "Jag måste skynda mig på". Lena and Orup set up their own show on China Teatern in Stockholm at the same time as the album release. The show was a critical and public success. Over 113,000 saw it in 2007, and there was a new premiere of the show in Gothenburg in early 2008. After its success in Stockholm and Goteborg, the show Lena+Orup went on tour across Sweden late 2008. At the same time, Lena and Orup recorded a duet album called "Dubbel", released in November.

Although she sewed her own stage clothes during her early career, she has said that she no longer has the time. In the early 1990s, she was one of three pop stars who were portrayed on stamps in Sweden; the others were Roxette and Jerry Williams. In the 1980s, she sang a duet on TV with American singer Michael Bolton.

Melodifestivalen 

Philipsson has participated in Melodifestivalen, the Swedish pre-selection for the Eurovision Song Contest six times: four times as a performer and twice as a songwriter.

As a performer
 1986, Kärleken är evig (2nd) (Love is eternal)
 1987, Dansa i neon (5th) (Dancing in neon)
 1988, Om igen (2nd) (Yet again)
 2004, Det gör ont (Winner) (It hurts)
As a songwriter
 1991, Tvillingsjäl (performed by Pernilla Wahlgren) (Soulmate)
 1999, Det svär jag på (performed by Arvingarna) (I swear)

Discography

Studio albums
Chart placings below are from Sverigetopplistan, the official Swedish top 60 singles and top 60 albums charts.

2001 single Spell of Love reached #53
2004 single It Hurts (English version of Det gor ont) reached #4 
2011 single Dancing in the Neon Light featuring Dead by April reached #50

Other albums 
 Boy (1987)
 Hitlåtar med Lena Philipsson 1985–1987 (1988)
 Lena Philipsson (1994)
 Hennes bästa (1998)
 Lena Philipsson Collection 1984–2001 (2001) – (reached #13 in the Swedish chart)
 100% Lena/20 hits (2002)
 Lady Star (2006)
 Lena 20 år (2007) – (reached #2 in the Swedish chart)

Singles 

 "Boy" / "You Open My Eyes" (As Lea, 1984)
 "Kärleken är evig" / "Om kärleken är blind" (1986)
 "Åh Amadeus" (1986)
 "Jag känner (Ti Sento)" (1986)
 "Dansa i neon" (1987)
 "Cheerio" / "Det går väl an" (1987)
 "Saknar dig innan du går" (1987)
 "Den ende" (1987)
 "I'm a Fool" / "Teach Me Tiger" (1987)
 "Om igen" / "Vem skall sova över" (1988)
 "Talking in Your Sleep" (1988)
 "I varje spegel" / "Ain't it Just the Way" (1988)
 "Tänd ett ljus" / "What Can I Do?" (1989)
 "Standing in My Rain" / "Blue Jeans" (1989)
 "Why (Så lätt kommer du inte undan)" / "strong man" (1989)
 "Blue jeans/How does it feel" (1990)
 "The Escape" (1991)
 "006" / "Hard to Be a Lover" (1991)
 "The Preacher" (1991)
 "Are You in or are You Out" (1992)
 "Fantasy" (As Lena Philipson, 1993)
 "Give Me Your Love" (As Lena Philipson, 1993)
 "Baby Baby Love" (As Lena Philipson,1993)
 "Månsken i augusti" (As Lena Philipssson, 1994)
 "Kärlek kommer med sommar" / "Vila hos mig" (1995)
 "Stjärnorna" (1995)
 "Moder Swea" / "Underbar" (1995)
 "Bästa vänner" (1997)
 "Tänk om jag aldrig mer" (1997)
 "I Believe in Miracles" (2000) (radio)
 "Fly Me Over the Rainbow" (2001) (radio)
 "Spell of Love" / "Lady Star" (2001)
 "Det gör ont" (2004)
 "Delirium" (2004)
 "Lena Anthem" (2004)
 "På gatan där jag bor" (2005)
 "Unga pojkar & äldre män" (2005)
 "Han jobbar i affär" (2005)
 "Jag ångrar ingenting" (2006)
 "Det ringer på min dörr" (2006)
 "Nu när du gått (with Orup)" (2008)
 "Fem minuter i himlen (with Orup)" (2009)
 "Dancing in the Neon Light (with Dead By April)" (2011)
 "Idiot" (2011)
 "Live Tomorrow" (2011)
 ”Galen” (2018)
 ”Maria Magdalena” (2019)
 ”Du ljuger” (2019)
 ”Du är aldrig ensam” (2019)

Other appearances 

 Schlagertimmen (1986)
 Jacobs stege (1988) performing "Aquarius" with Igor Nikolayev
 Melodifestival special (1999)
 Barn 2000 (2000)
 Schooldays (2000)
 Livet är en schlager soundtrack (2000)
 Kopparbärs-Rock Vol.5 (2001)
 Melodifestivalen 2003 (as co-host) (2003) performing "Flickorna i Småland" with Charlotte Perrelli.
 Melodifestivalen 2006 (as host) (2006)
 Konstkuppen 2013 (as host) (2013)
 Performing at Julgalan (2014)

Svensktoppen songs

Om kärleken är blind – 1986
Kärleken är evig – 1986
Åh Amadeus – 1986
Det går väl an – 1986
Dansa i neon – 1987
Saknar dej innan du går – 1987
Om igen – 1988
I varje spegel – 1988
Månsken i augusti – 1994
Stjärnorna – 1995
Det gör ont – 2004
Delirium – 2004
Lena Anthem – 2004–2005
På gatan där jag bor – 2004–2005
Unga pojkar & äldre män – 2005
Han jobbar i affär – 2005–2006
Jag ångrar ingenting – 2006
Nu när du gått – 2008 (with Orup)

Failing to enter the list
Bästa vänner – 1997
Det ringer på min dörr – 2006
Jag måste skynda mig på – 2007 (with Orup)

Songs on Radio P3 Tracks Top 20 Chart

 Dansa i neon – 1987
 I'm a Fool – 1988
 Om igen – 1988
 Talkin in Your Sleep – 1988
 Tänd ett ljus – 1989
 Standing in My Rain – 1989/1990
 Why (så lätt kommer du inte undan) – 1990
 The Escape – 1991
 006 – 1991
 Are You in, or are You out – 1992
 Fantasy – 1993
 Månsken i augusti – 1994
 Stjärnona – 1995
 Det gör ont – 2004
 Delirum – 2004
 Lena Anthem – 2004
 På gatan där jag bor – 2005
 Unga pojkar & äldre män – 2005
 Han jobbar i affär – 2005–2006
 Jag ångrar ingenting – 2006

Just outside the list
 Blue Jeans, 1989
 Give Me Your Love, 1993
 Spell of Love, 2001

References

External links 

 
 
 

1966 births
Living people
People from Vetlanda Municipality
Eurovision Song Contest entrants of 2004
Melodifestivalen winners
Eurovision Song Contest entrants for Sweden
Swedish women singers
Swedish-language singers
Schlager musicians
Melodifestivalen contestants of 2004
Melodifestivalen contestants of 1988
Melodifestivalen contestants of 1987
Melodifestivalen contestants of 1986